A Tragedian in Spite of Himself , also known as A Reluctant Tragic Hero) is an 1889 one-act play by Anton Chekhov.

Synopsis
In the play, Ivan Ivanovitch Tolkachov asks to borrow a revolver from his friend, Alexey Alexeyevitch Murashkin. Murashkin inquires to the reason, and Tolkachov complains bitterly about the bad events in his life. Murashkin expresses his sympathy, and then asks Tolkachov to take a sewing machine and a caged canary to Olga Pavlovna, a mutual acquaintance. On hearing Murashkin's request, Tolkachov snaps and begins chasing Murashkin around the room, screaming that he wants blood.

External links
 Text of the play

Plays by Anton Chekhov
1899 plays